Riccardo Patrick Emilio Lisi (born March 17, 1956 in Halifax, Nova Scotia) is a former Major League Baseball outfielder. He was drafted by the Texas Rangers in the 13th round of the 1974 amateur draft, and played for the Rangers in 1981. The 25-year-old rookie stood 6'0" and weighed 175 lbs.

Lisi spent about three weeks with Texas, playing in his first game May 9, 1981 and his last on May 29. He made his major league debut as a pinch runner for catcher Jim Sundberg against the Baltimore Orioles at Arlington Stadium. He appeared in 9 games and hit .312 (5-for-16) with 1 run batted in and 6 runs scored. He drew 4 walks which pushed his on-base percentage up to .450. In eight outfield appearances he handled 9 chances without an error.

On February 19, 1982 Lisi was traded to the Baltimore Orioles, and never again reached the big league level. He continued to play minor league baseball until , spending his final professional season with the Maine Guides in the Cleveland Indians farm system.

External links
, or Retrosheet, or Baseball News Network (coaching report), or Pura Pelota (Venezuelan Winter League)

1956 births
Living people
Anderson Rangers players
Asheville Tourists players
Baseball people from Nova Scotia
Canadian expatriate baseball players in the United States
Charleston Charlies players
Gulf Coast Rangers players
Maine Guides players
Major League Baseball outfielders
Major League Baseball players from Canada
Minor league baseball coaches
Richmond Braves players
Rochester Red Wings players
Sportspeople from Halifax, Nova Scotia
Texas Rangers players
Tiburones de La Guaira players
Canadian expatriate baseball players in Venezuela
Tucson Toros players
Tulsa Drillers players
Wichita Aeros players